Peter Wenzel may refer to:
Peter Wenzel (alpine skier) (born 1943), Australian Olympic alpine skier
Peter Wenzel (weightlifter) (born 1952), German Olympic weightlifter